Mount Johns is a solitary nunatak rising  above the ice surface, about  west of the Heritage Range, in the Ellsworth Mountains of Antarctica. It was discovered by the Charles R. Bentley-led Marie Byrd Land Traverse Party on January 27, 1958, and was named for Robert H. Johns (1932–58), an International Geophysical Year Byrd Station meteorologist in 1957 who died in the Arctic following his tour of duty at Byrd Station.

See also
 Mountains in Antarctica

References

Mountains of Ellsworth Land